The 8th Frigate Squadron was an administrative unit of the Royal Navy from 1973 to 1993.

Operational history
During its existence, the squadron included ,  and Type 22 frigates.  Ships from the squadron participated in the Cod Wars, the Silver Jubilee Fleet Review, the Falklands War, the Armilla Patrol,    and as part of STANAVFORLANT. The squadron was disbanded as part of the Royal Navy's reorganization in the mid-1990s.

Squadron commander

See also
 List of squadrons and flotillas of the Royal Navy

References

Frigate squadrons of the Royal Navy